Yak skiing is a sport practiced in the Indian hill resort of Manali, Himachal Pradesh, as a tourist attraction. The sport involves a skier waiting at the bottom of a slope and a yak at the top of the hill; yak and skier are connected by means of a rope going around a pulley at the top of the hill. To engage the yak, the skier must shake (and swiftly put down) a bucket of pony nuts. This attracts the yak, which charges downhill and pulls the skier upward by means of the rope.

See also 
 Skijoring
 Yak polo, another sport (or tourist attraction) involving yaks

References

Animals in sport
Kullu
Skiing in India
Tourism in Himachal Pradesh
Types of skiing
Yaks